This is a list of museums in Morocco by location.

Agadir 
 Musée de patrimoine Amazigh

Casablanca 
 Moroccan Jewish Museum

Fez 

 Dar Batha Museum
 Nejjarine Museum of Wooden Arts & Crafts
 Museum of Arms (Borj Nord)

Marrakech 
 Marrakech Museum
 Marrakech Telecommunication Museum
 The Photography Museum of Marrakesh
 Majorelle Garden
 Dar Si Said Museum
Dar el Bacha – Musée des Confluences
Museum Farid Belkahia
Mouassine Museum
 Yves Saint Laurent Museum in Marrakesh
 The Museum of African Contemporary Art Al Maaden (Macaal)
 Mohammed VI Museum for the Water Civilization in Morocco - Aman
Tiskiwin Museum

Meknès
 Dar Jamaï Museum

Nador 
 Ameziane Museum

Rabat 
 Banque al-Maghrib Museum (History of coins, currencies and banking)
 National Photography Museum
 Maroc Telecom Museum
 Mohammed VI Museum of Modern and Contemporary Art
 Rabat Archaeological Museum

Salé 
 Belghazi Museum
 Museum of the living bee (Musée de l'abeille vivante)

Tangier 
 American Legation, Tangier
 Dar el Makhzen (Tangier)
 Forbes Museum of Tangier
 Museum of Contemporary Art (Tangier)
 Fondation Lorin
 Musée de Carmen-Macein

See also

Tourism in Morocco
History of Morocco
Culture of Morocco
List of museums

References

 *
Museums
Museums
Museums
Museums
Morocco